Lianozovo is a planned station on the Lyublinsko-Dmitrovskaya line of the Moscow Metro, in the Dmitrovsky District, between the planned stations Fiztekh and Yakhromskaya.  The station is being developed, along with the nearby , as part of a transport interchange hub that would also serve Line D1 of the Moscow Central Diameters.

The construction is being managed by Mosinzhproekt.  The station is designed as an enfilade, with alternating dark and light colors resembling chocolate and coffee.  The floor will be made of light gray granite, whilst the station's ceiling, walls, and 46 columns are to be covered with metal panelling.

The station is one of 14 Moscow Metro stations scheduled to open in 2023.  Lianozovo is scheduled to open in September, together with adjacent stations Fiztekh and Yakhromskaya.  The station's main structural elements were completed by January.

Gallery

Notes

References 

Lyublinsko-Dmitrovskaya Line
Moscow Metro stations

ru:Лианозово (станция метро)